MGM HD was an all high-definition television cable network owned by the MGM HD Productions subsidiary of Metro-Goldwyn-Mayer (MGM), a division of Amazon's MGM Holdings, Inc. It featured movies from the Metro-Goldwyn-Mayer library of 1,200 movies mastered in a high-definition-compatible format. The films were usually presented uncut and in their original aspect ratio, although some films were edited for content for daytime viewing and commercial breaks were often added during peak viewing hours. MGM HD offered programming like the MGM Channel which is available in 110 countries.

Carriage

United States
At closing, the network was available available via AT&T U-verse, DirecTV, Charter Spectrum, Mediacom, and Frontier FiOS and Philo in the United States. MGM HD was removed from the Comcast Xfinity channel lineup in February 2019. The network was removed from Verizon FiOS at the start of 2021, while Dish removed it on August 31, 2022.

On October 25, it was confirmed that Amazon would shut down MGM HD on October 31; its assets will be merged onto sister service Epix, which re-branded as MGM+ on January 15, 2023.

Europe
The N satellite service in Poland carries MGM HD. It was launched on December 7, 2006, in Poland.

In the United Kingdom, MGM HD launched on 14 December 2009 on the Sky UK satellite service. The channel was run in partnership with Sky. On 27 April 2011, the channel was added to UPC Ireland's lineup. On 16 January 2014, MGM HD ceased broadcasting in the UK and Ireland.  MGM continued to be available on the UPC (rebranded to Virgin Media Ireland in 2015) service in Ireland on channel 326 until it was removed in January 2018. MGM Germany was closed at the end of 2016.

References

Television channels and stations established in 2006
Television channels and stations established in 2007
Television channels and stations disestablished in 2022
Commercial-free television networks
Television networks in the United States
Movie channels in the United States
Metro-Goldwyn-Mayer subsidiaries
HD-only channels